Hinduism is the leading single religion of the Indo-Caribbean communities of the West Indies. Hindus are particularly well represented in Guyana, Suriname and Trinidad and Tobago, where they constituted 18 percent of the total population, as of 2011. The Cayman Islands also hosts a sizable Hindu population, with 2.4 percent of the country affiliating with the religion. Smaller groups of Indo-Caribbeans live elsewhere in the Caribbean, especially Puerto Rico, Jamaica, Belize, Barbados, Saint Vincent and the Grenadines, Saint Lucia, and Bahamas.

Hinduism by territories

Anguilla
The total Hindu population of Anguilla is 58 as of the 2011 Census. This represents 0.42% of the population and is an increase of 13 from the previous count of 45 (0.39%, taken from the 2001 Census). Hinduism is also the 7th fastest growing religion by percent (28.9%) and the 9th fastest by absolute change (13). Hindus also contributed 0.61% of the total population gain.

Antigua and Barbuda
The percentage of Hindus in Antigua and Barbuda as of the 2011 Census is 0.4%, or 379 adherents.  This represented growth of more than 40% from the 2001 Census, which showed that there were 157 active followers. This growth made the number of Hindus surpass Presbyterians (170 to 142), Salvation Army (369 to 365) and Islam (189 to 208). The population is mainly made up of Indian immigrants, who alone make up over 1.1% of the total population. Most Hindus are from the category of Indian/East Indian, which makes up less than 5%.

Bahamas
According to the 2010 Census, there were a total of 428 Hindus living in the Bahamas, making up 0.12% of the total population. The 2010 census showed that slightly more than half of Hindus (around 220 people) in the Bahamas are younger than age 34.

Barbados

Today, Barbados has 2,000 Indians living in the country. They came as recently immigrants from Guyana. Because of the huge Indian population, Hinduism became one of the growing religions of Barbados. The 2000 Census showed the number of Hindus in Barbados to be at 840, which accounted for 0.34% of the total population. The 2010 Census showed that the number of Hindus rose by 215 people (or 25%) to be at 1,055. This increased Hinduism's share of the total Barbados population from 0.34% in 2000 to 0.46% in 2010.

Bermuda
Most of the Hindus in Bermuda are of South Indian/Tamil descent. The population of Hindu's in Bermuda is 0.2%

Cayman Islands

Hinduism is the fastest growing religion in the Cayman Islands, with the population skyrocketing in recent years. Previously, there were only 98 Hindus in the Caymans according to the 2000 census (about 0.25% of the population). In the 2008 census, the number of Hindus increased to 510 (1% of the total population). The 2010 Census showed the number of Hindus decreasing to 454 (0.8% of the total Cayman Islands population). In 2021, the Hindu population increased to 1,671 (2.4% of the population).

Cuba 

Hindus who live in Cuba accounted for 0.2% of the population in 2010.

Dominica 

A non-negligible amount of Hindus live in Dominica, accounting for under 0.1% of the population.

Grenada
According to the 2000 census and the National Census Report 2001, there were 156 Hindus in Grenada accounting 0.15% of the total population.

Guadeloupe

Hinduism is a minority religion in Guadeloupe, followed by a small fraction of Indo-Guadeloupeans. According to a statistics data, Hinduism is practised by 0.5% of the people in Guadeloupe.

Martinique

Hinduism is followed in the Martinique by a small fraction of Indo-Martiniquais. As of 2007,Hinduism constitute 0.3% of the population of Martinique.

Jamaica

Jamaica was once home to 25,000 Hindus until the mid-20th century. However, most of them were converted to Christianity. In the last few decades, the population of Hindus in Jamaica decreased steeply. In the 1970s, 5,000 identified themselves as Hindus. Since then, the Hindu population of Jamaica has risen and it has become the second largest religion (after Christianity) in Jamaica. Diwali (pronounced Divali), the festival of lights, is celebrated in Jamaica every year. There were 1,453 Hindus in Jamaica according to the 2001 census. The 2011 Census showed that the number of Hindus in Jamaica increased by 383 people to be at 1,836 adherents. Hinduism's share of the total Jamaican population increased from 0.06% in 2001 to 0.07% of the population in 2011.

Montserrat
According to the 2001 census there were 31 Hindus in Montserrat, accounting for 0.8% of the total population and forming the 4th largest religious entity. Hindu males numbered 20 and made up 1.0% of the total number of males in the 2001 Census, with 11 Hindu females making up 0.6% of the female total.

Puerto Rico 
As of 2006, there were 3,482 Hindus in Puerto Rico making 0.09% of the population according to Religious Intelligence.

Saint Kitts and Nevis
Hindus made up 1.82% of the total population of Saint Kitts and Nevis according to the 2010 census  up from 0.8% in 2001. There are 860 Hindus in Saint Kittie and Nevis. Hinduism is currently the second largest religion in St. Kitts-Nevis after Christianity.

Saint Lucia
Most of the Indian community in Saint Lucia have converted to Christianity. Only 325 people were reported as Hindus in the 2001 census (0.2% of the total population census). The 2010 Census showed the percentage total of Hindus had increased to 0.3%. Most of them were recent immigrants. Of the original East Indian community, only 1-2% retains Hinduism.

Saint Vincent and the Grenadines
The 2000 census reported 83 Hindus in Saint Vincent and the Grenadines making up 0.08% of the total population. The 2000 Census showed that Hindus in St Vincent-Grenadines were overwhelmingly male, with only 77 females for every 100 males on average. The 2000 Census also showed a very youthful Hindu population, with less than 1.5% of Hindus being classified as "elder".

Trinidad and Tobago

Hinduism is a minority but significant religion in Trinidad and Tobago, making up over 18% in the 2011 census, the second largest religion in the islands. Hinduism has had a presence for 170 years, when the first Indians came to work. There are currently 240,100 Hindus in Trinidad and Tobago, with the decline resulting from emigration.

Turks and Caicos Islands
The Indian population in the Turks and Caicos Islands is mostly of Sindhi origin. The community mostly is employed in retail jewellery and electronics business, in addition to some doctors, nurses, teachers, chartered accountants and other sectors. Many Indians are self-employed, and some are employed in the local hospitality industry.

United States Virgin Islands
According to the 2000 census there were more than 400 Hindus in the United States Virgin Islands (0.4% of the population). Most of them were recent immigrants from India, and most of them reside on St. Thomas.

British Virgin Islands
According to the 1991 census, Hindus constituted 2.16% of the population of British Virgin Islands, which then decreased to 1.95% in the 2001 census. It further decreased to 1.88% in 2011 census.

Hindu populations according to the latest Census

 Guyana: 213,282 or 28.4% (Census of 2002)
 Suriname: 120,623 or 22.3% (Census of 2012) 
 Trinidad and Tobago: 240,100 or 18.2% (Census of 2011)
 Puerto Rico: 3,482 or 0.09% (Religious Intelligence 2006)
 Jamaica: 1,836 or 0.07% (Census of 2011)
 Barbados: 1,055 or 0.38% (Census of 2010)
 St Lucia: 500 or 0.3% (Census of 2010)
 Bahamas: 428 or 0.12% (Census of 2010)
 US Virgin Islands: 400 or 0.4% (Census of 2000)
 Antigua and Barbuda: 379 or 0.4% (Census of 2011)
 St Kitts and Nevis: 860 or 1.82% (Census of 2011)
 Grenada: 156 or 0.15% (Census of 2001)
 St Vincent: 83 or 0.08% (Census of 2001)
 Anguilla: 58 or 0.42% (Census of 2011)
 Montserrat: 31 or 0.8% (Census of 2001)
Cayman Islands:454 or 0.8%(Census of 2011)

See also

 Indo-Caribbean
 Indo-Trinidadian
 Hinduism in Trinidad and Tobago
 Hinduism in South America
 Hinduism in the United States
 Hinduism in Canada

References

 This article contains public domain material from the Library of Congress Country Studies on Trinidad and Tobago and Guyana (1995).

West Indies
Religion in the Caribbean
 
Indo-Caribbean religion